A number of short films were screened in the "Main Programme Short" section of the 2002 Rotterdam Film Festival.

List of short films

References

External links 
 Rotterdam Film Festival 2002 Main Program Short
 Rotterdam International Film Festival (IFFR) Edition 2002

Film festivals in the Netherlands
Culture in Rotterdam
2002 film festivals
2002 festivals in Europe
2002 in the Netherlands